Ceanothus jepsonii is a species of shrub in the family Rhamnaceae known by the common names musk brush and Jepson ceanothus.

Description
This species of shrub is variable, particularly across its two varieties: 
Ceanothus jepsonii var. jepsonii is a spreading plant growing up to about half a meter tall. It bears inflorescences of blue or purple flowers and spherical fruits. 
Ceanothus jepsonii var. albiflorus is a white-flowered variety approaching a meter in maximum height. Its fruits are more oblong.

Both varieties have firm, toothed evergreen leaves oppositely arranged, curved, often spiny (holly-like), and with their edges turned under. The flowers tend to have a musky odor.

Distribution
It is endemic to California, where it grows in dry, shrubby habitat in the San Francisco Bay Area and the Coast Ranges to the north, often on serpentine soils.

References

External links
Jepson Manual Treatment — Ceanothus jepsonii
USDA Plants Profile
Ceanothus jepsonii — U.C. Photo gallery

jepsonii
Endemic flora of California
Natural history of the California chaparral and woodlands
Natural history of the California Coast Ranges
Natural history of the San Francisco Bay Area
Plants described in 1894
Taxa named by Edward Lee Greene